Carex crinita, called fringed sedge, is a species of flowering plant in the genus Carex, native to central and eastern Canada and the central and eastern United States. It is the namesake of the Carex crinita species complex.

Subtaxa
The following varieties are currently accepted:
Carex crinita var. brevicrinis Fernald
Carex crinita var. crinita
Carex crinita var. porteri (Olney) Fernald

References

crinita
Flora of Eastern North America
Plants described in 1792